Jackeys Marsh is a rural locality in the local government area (LGA) of Meander Valley in the Launceston LGA region of Tasmania. The 2016 census recorded a population of 40 for the state suburb of Jackeys Marsh.

History 
Jackeys Marsh was gazetted as a locality in 1968.

Geography
The waters of Lake Huntsman and the Meander River form much of the western boundary.

Road infrastructure 
Route C167 (Meander Road) passes to the north-west. From there East Meander Road and Jackeys Marsh Road provides access to the locality.

References

Towns in Tasmania
Localities of Meander Valley Council